Tobias Karlsson (born 4 June 1981) is a Swedish former handball player who last played for SG Flensburg Handewitt. He competed for the Swedish national team that won the silver medal at the 2012 Summer Olympics in London.

Honours
 German Championship:
 : 2018, 2019
 National Cup of Germany:
 : 2015
Swedish Championship:
 : 2006, 2007, 2008
 EHF Champions League:
 : 2014
 EHF Cup Winner's Cup:
 : 2012

References

1981 births
Living people
Swedish male handball players
Olympic handball players of Sweden
Handball players at the 2012 Summer Olympics
Handball players at the 2016 Summer Olympics
Olympic silver medalists for Sweden
Olympic medalists in handball
Medalists at the 2012 Summer Olympics
People from Karlskrona
Hammarby IF Handboll players
THW Kiel players
HSG Nordhorn-Lingen players
SG Flensburg-Handewitt players
Expatriate handball players
Handball-Bundesliga players
Swedish expatriate sportspeople in Germany
Swedish expatriate sportspeople in Norway
Sportspeople from Blekinge County
21st-century Swedish people